Brutto may refer to:

Raffaella Brutto (b.1988), Italian snowboarder
Brutto mount, Parenti, Calabria
Brutto (band), Belarusian band formed in 2014
Diego Lo Brutto (born 1953), French wrestler.

See also 

 Bruto (disambiguation)